What Shall I Do? is a 1924 American silent drama film directed by John G. Adolfi and starring Dorothy Mackaill, John Harron, and Louise Dresser.

Synopsis
After an accident, a man suffers from amnesia and leaves his wife and child to return to his old life.

Cast
 Dorothy Mackaill as Jeanie Andrews 
 John Harron as Jack Nelson 
 Louise Dresser as Mrs. McLean 
 William V. Mong as Henry McLean 
 Betty Morrissey as Dolly McLean 
 Ann May as Mary Conway 
 Ralph McCullough as Tom Conway 
 Joan Standing as Lizzie 
 Tom O'Brien as Big Jim Brown 
 Danny Hoy as Joe, a Bus Boy

Preservation
With no copies of What Shall I Do? located in any film archives, it is a lost film.

References

Bibliography
 Munden, Kenneth White. The American Film Institute Catalog of Motion Pictures Produced in the United States, Part 1. University of California Press, 1997.

External links

1924 films
1924 drama films
Silent American drama films
Films directed by John G. Adolfi
American silent feature films
1920s English-language films
American black-and-white films
Films distributed by W. W. Hodkinson Corporation
1920s American films